Jakes or Jakeš is a surname that may refer to
 James Jakes (born 1987), British racing driver
 Jiří Jakeš (born 1982), Czech ice hockey player
 John Jakes (born 1932), American novelist
 Leigh Jakes (born 1988), American association football player
 Miloš Jakeš (1922–2020), General Secretary of the Communist Party of Czechoslovakia (1987–1989)
 Petr Jakeš (1940–2005), Czech geologist.
 T. D. Jakes (born 1957), American pastor
 Tyler Jakes, American musician, songwriter, and producer
 Van Jakes (born 1961), former professional American footballer

See also
Jackes